Delapierre is a French surname. Notable people with the surname include:

 François Delapierre (1970–2015), a French politician.
 Nicolas Benjamin Delapierre (1739–1802), a French artist.
 Germaine Delapierre, a French athlete.
 Robert Delapierre (1891–1970), a Belgian philatelist.

French culture